Amblyseius divisus is a species of mite in the family Phytoseiidae.

References

divisus
Articles created by Qbugbot
Animals described in 1961